Pish Kuh-e Pain (also Romanized as Pīsh Kūh-e Pā’īn; also known as Pīshgūpāeen) is a village in Lat Leyl Rural District, Otaqvar District, Langarud County, Gilan Province, Iran. At the 2006 census, its population was 106, in 31 families.

References 

Populated places in Langarud County